Two for the Road is a 1980 album by the jazz singer Carmen McRae and the jazz pianist George Shearing.

Track listing
 "I Don't Stand a Ghost of a Chance with You" (Bing Crosby, Ned Washington, Victor Young) – 3:41
 "You're All I Need" (Walter Jurmann, Gus Kahn, Bronislaw Kaper) – 3:15
 "Gentleman Friend" (Arnold B. Horwitt, Richard Lewine) – 4:11
 "More Than You Know" (Edward Eliscu, Billy Rose, Vincent Youmans) – 4:33
 "Cloudy Morning" (Marvin Fisher, Joseph McCarthy) – 2:55
 "Too Late Now" (Burton Lane, Alan Jay Lerner) – 5:02
 "If I Should Lose You" (Ralph Rainger, Leo Robin) – 2:16
 "Ghost of Yesterday" (Arthur Herzog, Jr., Irene Kitchings) – 4:51
 "What Is There to Say?" (Vernon Duke, Yip Harburg) – 4:54
 "Two for the Road" (Leslie Bricusse, Henry Mancini) – 3:29

Personnel

Performance
Carmen McRae – vocals
George Shearing – piano, vocals on "Two for the Road"

References

1980 albums
George Shearing albums
Carmen McRae albums
Albums produced by Carl Jefferson
Concord Records albums
Vocal–instrumental duet albums